In the mathematical discipline of graph theory, the edge  space and vertex space of an undirected graph are vector spaces defined in terms of the edge and vertex sets, respectively. These vector spaces make it possible to use techniques of linear algebra in studying the graph.

Definition
Let  be a finite undirected graph. The vertex space  of G is the vector space over the finite field of two elements 
 of all functions . Every element of  naturally corresponds the subset of V which assigns a 1 to its vertices. The edge space  is the -vector space freely generated by the edge set E. The dimension of the vertex space is thus the number of vertices of the graph, while the dimension of the edge space is the number of edges.

These definitions can be made more explicit. For example, we can describe the edge space as follows:
 vector addition is defined as the symmetric difference: 
 scalar multiplication is defined by:
 
 

Properties
The incidence matrix  for a graph  defines one possible linear transformation

The cycle space and the cut space are linear subspaces of the edge space.

References
 (the electronic 3rd edition is freely available on author's site).

See also
cycle space
cut space

Algebraic graph theory